This is a list of commercial 5G NR networks around the globe, showing their frequency bands.



Commercial deployments 
Notes
This list of network deployments does not imply widespread deployment or national coverage.
The deployed bandwidth is listed for the respective band.

See also 
 5G NR
 List of 5G NR frequency bands
 List of LTE networks

References 

Lists by country
Telecommunications lists
5G (telecommunication)